Devarattam is a 2019 Indian Tamil-language action drama film written and directed by M. Muthaiah produced by K. E. Gnanavel Raja. The film stars Gautham Karthik and Manjima Mohan, while Vinodhini Vaidyanathan, Soori, and FEFSI Vijayan play supporting roles. The film's soundtrack is composed by Nivas K. Prasanna with editing done by Praveen K. L. and cinematography by Sakthi Saravanan. The film released on 1 May 2019. It received mixed to negative reviews and it is a box office bomb.

Plot
Vetri (Gautham Karthik) lives in a  casteist pride(devar) joint family with six sisters and their husbands. He has been brought up by his eldest sister Pechi (Vinodhini Vaidyanathan), and their relationship is more like a mother and son. Vetri, despite being a lawyer, has an anger problem and gets into unnecessary fights, but everybody in the family loves him as he is the first advocate in their family. However, soon he takes the law into his hands when he murders a sexual offender and his friend who happens to be the adopted son of Madurai's dreaded gangster, Kodumpavi Ganesan (FEFSI Vijayan). Ganesan swears revenge and promises to kill Vetri just like he murdered his son in the streets of Madurai in broad daylight. However, Ganesan instead kills Pechi and her husband (Bose Venkat). As revenge, Vetri kills Ganesan and places his severed head inside the fridge at home, a deed that he was supposed to have done before the funeral of the deceased relatives.

Cast 

 Gautham Karthik as Vetri
 Manjima Mohan as Madhu
 Soori as Vetri's 4th brother-in-law
 FEFSI Vijayan as Kodumpavi Ganesan
 Vinodhini Vaidyanathan as Pechi, Vetri's 1st sister
 Bose Venkat as Vetri's 1st brother-in-law
 Saravana Sakthi as Vetri's 2nd brother-in-law
 Aaru Bala as Vetri's 3rd brother-in-law
 Vijayakumar as Vetri's 5th brother-in-law
 Munish Raja as Vetri's 6th brother-in-law
 Akalya Venkatesan as Vetri's sister
 Kannika Ravi as Bhavani
 Shenbagam as Vetri's sister
 Sindhu as Vetri's sister
 Saranya as Vetri's sister
 Akila as Vetri's sister
 Vela Ramamoorthy as Kalyani Thevar, Vetri's father
 G. Gnanasambandam as Bojarajan
 Chandru Sujan as Deivam, Ganesan's son
 Veeran Selvarajan as Veeran
 Hello Kandasamy as Vanitha's father
 Ragu Aditya as Munna
 TSR as a judge

Critical Reception
Srivatsan.S of The Hindu wrote "Devarattam is yet another Tamil film that uses rape/sexual assault as a ploy to take the story forward. The film comes at a time when the disturbing Pollachi incident is still fresh in our minds." Sreedhar Pillai of Firstpost said "In the end, Devarattam seems like just another film which shows Madurai as a traditional land that is also a blood-soaked, lawless place where cops and gangsters are hand in glove." Janani.K of India Today writes as "Director Muthaiah's films follow the same template. So much so, that you can guess the story even before you have seen the film. Devarattam is the same: a cliched rural entertainer. Skip Devarattam at ease." Subhakeerthana.S of The Indian Express wrote "Mindless violence and bloodshed fill this below-average rural drama". Karthik Kumar of Hindustan Times said "If you are interested in a generic rural masala entertainer but one that has great action, then this Gautham Karthik starrer could be a film for you." Sudhir Sreenivasan of Cinema Express wrote "The film, ostensibly mounted on Thevar pride, makes the sort of association with violence we have generally been used to seeing in such movies" Anjana Shekar of The News Minute wrote "It is not just a sentiment-action-revenge-drama formula. It is the director’s anguish at how men treat women in this society. In the end, the message rings loud and clear for all the men - “Our heroism and courage is for the sake of protecting women, not for raping them!”."

Box office
The film earned Rs 6.5 crore in its opening weekend.

Soundtrack
This film's soundtrack is composed by Nivas K. Prasanna with lyrics written by Yugabharathi, Magizh Thirumeni, Vivek, and Pa. Vijay

References

External links 

2010s Tamil-language films
2019 action drama films
Films scored by Nivas K. Prasanna
Indian action drama films
Films directed by M. Muthaiah
2019 films